Cuba national under-20 football team is the under-20 football (soccer) team of Cuba. The team made its debut at the 2013 FIFA U-20 World Cup in Turkey.

Competitive Record

FIFA U-20 World Cup Record

Current squad
 The following players were called up for the 2022 CONCACAF U-20 Championship.
 Match dates: 18 June – 3 July 2022
 Caps and goals correct as of:' 18 June 2022
 Names in italics denote players who have been capped for the senior team.''

See also
Cuba national football team
Cuba national under-17 football team

References

u20
Cuba
Football